Auratonota serotina is a species of moth of the family Tortricidae. It is found in Mexico.

The wingspan is about 20 mm. The ground colour of the forewings is glossy cream along the markings edges, but otherwise golden-ochreous. The markings themselves are blackish brown, but ochreous in the tornal area.

References

Moths described in 2000
Auratonota
Moths of Central America